Ypsolopha asperella is a moth of the family Ypsolophidae. It is found in Northern and Central Europe, Siberia, Korea, China, Asia Minor and Mideast Asia.

The wingspan is 20–21 mm.

The larvae feed on apple, Crataegus, Cerasus, Pyrus, Armeniaca, Persica and Prunus species (including Prunus sargentii).

References

External links

Ypsolophidae
Moths described in 1761
Moths of Asia
Moths of Europe
Taxa named by Carl Linnaeus